The list of shipwrecks in 1975 includes ships sunk, foundered, grounded, or otherwise lost during 1975.

January

5 January

6 January

11 January

14 January

20 January

29 January

25 January

February

2 February

11 February

20 February

|-

Unknown date

March

14 March

17 March

April

4 April

6 April

15 April

17 April

19 April

22 April

27 April

30 April

May

2 May

11 May

13 May

25 May

Unknown date

June

6 June

13 June

16 June

21 June

July

6 July

14 July

15 July

19 July

23 July

24 July

August

10 August

15 August

20 August

21 August

September

1 September

16 September

26 September

October

4 October

12 October

November

1 November

10 November

December

3 December

7 December

13 December

18 December

20 December

26 December

28 December

30 December

Unknown date

References 

1975
 
Ships